The 2021 General Tire 200 was a ARCA Menards Series West race held on June 5, 2021. It was contested over 51 laps—extended from 50 laps due to an overtime finish—on the  road course. It was the second race of the 2021 ARCA Menards Series West season. Stewart-Haas Racing driver Chase Briscoe, running full-time in the NASCAR Cup Series, lead every lap en route to the victory.

Background

Entry list 

 (R) denotes rookie driver.
 (i) denotes driver who is ineligible for series driver points.

Practice/Qualifying 
Practice and qualifying were combined into 1 1-hour long session, where the fastest recorded lap counts as a qualifying lap.

Starting Lineups

Race

Race results

References 

2021 in sports in California
General Tire 200
2021 ARCA Menards Series West